Sultan Ismail Petra Mosque is a Chinese-style mosque in Rantau Panjang, Kelantan, Malaysia. The mosque resembles the 1,000-year-old Niujie Mosque in Beijing, China.

Construction started on September 12, 2005, and the mosque was inaugurated in August 2009 with a total estimated building cost of RM8.8 million. The mosque boasts a total area of 3.7 acres and can accommodate 1,000 worshipers at one time.

Location 
The mosque is located at the edge of the Pasir Mas-Rantau Panjang Highway, about 2 km from Rantau Panjang.

See also
 Islam in Malaysia

References

2009 establishments in Malaysia
Mosques completed in 2009
Chinese architecture in Malaysia
Mosques in Kelantan
Pasir Mas District